Harold Hawkins may refer to:
Hawkshaw Hawkins (Harold Franklin Hawkins, 1923–1963), American country music singer
Harold Hawkins (sport shooter) (1886–1917), British Olympic shooter
Frank Hawkins (politician) (Francis Harold Hawkins, 1897–1971), Australian politician
J. Harold Hawkins (c. 1892–1961), justice of the Supreme Court of Georgia

See also
Harry Hawkins (disambiguation)